James Stewart (23 November 1934 – 26 January 2013), known as Jimmy Stewart, was an activist from Northern Ireland.

Stewart was born in Ballymena to a Protestant family, and studied at the Ballymena Academy. He became a Queen's Scout and took an interest in his Scottish heritage. He trained as a teacher at Stranmillis University College, and there met active communist Edwina Menzies, the two marrying in 1954.

In 1955, Stewart joined the Communist Party of Northern Ireland, initially while teaching at Hemsworth Square School and then Somerdale School on the Shankill Road. He and Menzies attended the World Youth Festival in 1957, and in the same year he became general secretary of the party's youth section. He rapidly became a key figure in the party, editing Unity, its newspaper, completing the drafting of the party's programme, Ireland's Path to Socialism, and becoming its Deputy General Secretary in 1964.

The Communist Party of Northern Ireland merged into the Communist Party of Ireland in 1970, and Stewart left teaching to become a full-time party worker, remaining Deputy General Secretary of the new group. In this role, he was active in the Northern Ireland Civil Rights Association, Belfast Trades Council.

He stood in the 1973 Northern Ireland Assembly election in Belfast West, but took last place with only 123 votes, and came bottom of the poll for Belfast City Council at the 1977, 1981 and 1985 local elections.

Stewart rose to become general secretary of the party in 1984, serving until 2001, when he instead became its chairman.

References

1934 births
2013 deaths
Communist Party of Ireland politicians
Communists from Northern Ireland
Irish communists
People from Ballymena
People educated at Ballymena Academy
Alumni of Stranmillis University College
Schoolteachers from Northern Ireland